Robin Jacobsson  may refer to:

Robin Jacobsson (footballer) (born 1990), Swedish footballer
Robin Jacobsson (ice hockey) (born 1986), Swedish ice hockey player